The Sony Xperia XZ1 Compact is a compact flagship Android smartphone manufactured and marketed by Sony. The phone was announced to the public along with the Sony Xperia XZ1 at a press conference which was held at IFA 2017 on August 31, 2017. It is the successor to the Sony Xperia X Compact and the first flagship-grade compact smartphone from Sony since the Sony Xperia Z5 Compact. It is known as the SO-02K in Japan, where it is exclusive to the NTT Docomo carrier.

Specifications

Hardware
The Sony Xperia XZ1 Compact contains largely the same specifications as the Sony Xperia XZ1 but with a smaller 4.6" 720p screen. It features a Snapdragon 835 chipset, IP65/68 waterproofing and S-Force Front Surround stereo speakers. It also features the same 19MP, 1/2.3" Sony IMX400 camera found in the Sony Xperia XZ Premium, Sony Xperia XZs and Sony Xperia XZ1 that is capable of recording slow-motion video at 960 fps. 

Unlike the XZ1, the XZ1 Compact's body is made of glass fiber woven plastic. It came in four colors: Black, White Silver, Horizon Blue and Twilight Pink.

Software
The Sony Xperia XZ1 Compact (along with the larger XZ1) was the first Android smartphone to launch with Android 8.0 Oreo already installed.
Since end of January 2019 an update to Android 9 is available via OTA. As with the larger XZ1, it introduced a 3D scanning feature developed by Sony.

Reception
The Sony Xperia XZ1 Compact received mostly positive reception. Reviewers liked a return of a top-end processor and waterproof body compared to the Sony Xperia X Compact, as well as its display and battery life. However one criticism (along with the full size XZ1) was its outdated design and thick bezels, which TechnoBuffalo called "awkwardly stand out in 2017 as they would in 2012", and its high price was also criticized. Its main competitor was the first-generation iPhone SE, the only other small sized smartphone at the time.

It was succeeded by the Sony Xperia XZ2 Compact, which featured a new smooth curved design and a larger 5.0 inch display.

References

External links
 

Android (operating system) devices
Sony smartphones
Mobile phones introduced in 2017
Mobile phones with 4K video recording
ja:SO-02K